Whites Road in Chennai, Tamil Nadu, India branches off from Anna Salai, Chennai's arterial road near National Insurance Company after Thousand Lights Mosque and reaches up to Royapettah Clock Tower near Wesley Church. Chennai's famous Express Avenue shopping mall is located on this road.

Major institutions located at this road includes
 United India Insurance
 Corporation Bank
 Cognizant Technology Solutions
 Hobart Muslim Girls Higher Secondary School
 Wesley Higher Secondary School

References 

Roads in Chennai